Hyloscirtus diabolus is a species of frogs in the family Hylidae.

References

Hylidae